The 1983 season was the 18th season in football for the Miami Dolphins and they sought to return to the Super Bowl after losing to the Washington Redskins in Super Bowl XVII. It was also a turning point in the team's history, as in the 1983 NFL Draft a young quarterback slipped to deep in the opening round, being passed over by such teams as division rivals New York who drafted Ken O'Brien and New England who drafted Tony Eason. With the 27th pick, the Dolphins decided to take a chance on Dan Marino. In the draft's eighth round the Dolphins also selected receiver Mark Clayton.

David Woodley started the team's first five games but despite wins over Buffalo, New England and Kansas City the offense didn't move to Don Shula's liking. So in Week Six, with the Dolphins hosting the Bills the rookie Marino started. Marino had completed two touchdown passes in relief of Woodley in a 27–14 loss to the Raiders and then replaced Woodley during a 17–7 loss to the Saints with a touchdown and an interception, so the game against Buffalo was the third game of his career but his first start. The game proved to be a wild affair as Robb Riddick of the Bills fumbled the opening kickoff at his own 17 but Marino was intercepted by Steve Freeman on the next play. The Bills clawed to a 14–7 halftime lead but the Dolphins behind Marino stayed toe to toe as Marino threw for 370 yards and four touchdowns while handing off to Mark Clayton on an option pass for a touchdown to Mark Duper. The Bills tied the game in the final seconds and two Uwe von Schamann field goal attempts missed before Joe Danelo ended the game in a 38–35 Bills win.

Despite the loss Marino's performance cemented his role as the team's starter, and the Dolphins raced to win nine of their last ten games. Marino finished with 2,210 passing yards, 20 touchdowns and six interceptions. With the division wrapped up following a 26–17 win over the Oilers at the Astrodome Marino sat for the final two games of the season as Don Strock quarterbacked the Dolphins to wins over the Falcons and New York Jets.

Offseason 
June 25, 1983: Larry Gordon, the Miami Dolphins first round pick in the 1976 NFL Draft, died from heart failure

NFL draft

Personnel

Staff

Roster

Regular season

Schedule

Game summaries

Week 1

Week 6

Standings

Player stats

Passing

Postseason

AFC Divisional Playoff 

The Seahawks converted three turnovers in the second half into 13 points, while running back Curt Warner rushed for 113 yards and 2 touchdowns. Dolphins quarterback Dan Marino threw two touchdown passes in the second quarter: A 19-yard pass to Johnson and a 32-yard pass to wide receiver Mark Duper. Seattle's only score in the first half was quarterback Dave Krieg's 6-yard touchdown pass to running back Cullen Bryant. In the third quarter, a fumble led to Warner's 1-yard touchdown. A fourth quarter interception from Marino then led to Norm Johnson's 27-yard field goal to give Seattle a 17–13 lead. After the Dolphins regained the lead off running back Woody Bennett's 3-yard touchdown, Seattle responded with Warner's 2-yard touchdown. On the ensuing kickoff, Miami returner Fulton Walker fumbled, setting up Norm Johnson's 37-yard field goal. Barely enough time remained for the Dolphins to tie the game, but Fulton Walker fumbled the next kickoff as well, which sealed the game for the Seahawks.

References

External links 
 1983 Miami Dolphins at Pro-Football-Reference.com

Miami
Miami Dolphins seasons
AFC East championship seasons
Miami Dolphins